Dean Learner is a fictional character created and performed by British comedian Richard Ayoade in stage shows and television shows. Learner is a famous publisher, mostly of pornography, but also of the books of the fictional horror writer Garth Marenghi (played by Matthew Holness).

Ayoade first played Learner in the Edinburgh Fringe stage shows Garth Marenghi's Fright Knight and Garth Marenghi's Netherhead in 2000 and 2001 respectively. In 2004 he appeared in Channel 4's spoof horror comedy Garth Marenghi's Darkplace, and in 2006 in his own TV show, Man to Man with Dean Learner, which aired on Channel 4 from October 2006. It was recorded in Teddington Studios in April–May 2006 in front of a live audience and featured Learner interviewing celebrity guests – all of whom happen to be his clients (and played by Ayoade's writing partner Matthew Holness) – including Marenghi.

Character
The character is Garth Marenghi's publisher, and regards Marenghi and his (highly dubious) talents with a respect that sometimes borders on worship (he has been known to assault small children for criticising Marenghi's writing). No matter how tatty or ridiculous Marenghi's output is, Learner is forever in awe of Marenghi's gifts. Marenghi, of course, accepts Learner's praise without question, although he doesn't seem to have any great fondness for Learner in return.

A more famous quote from one of the episodes sees Learner praise Marenghi's talents: "Garth is the most significant artist I've ever worked with, and I've worked with Lulu and four other people. So, er, we're talking crème-de-la-crème."

Learner's attempts to first sell Darkplace were fruitless; he took the reels of 60 episodes of the show to Channel 4, whom he expected to take the footage and air it, no questions asked. However, the channel told him they did not ask him to make the show, which Learner had no idea they needed to do. Eventually the show enjoyed a brief stint in Peru, with Learner declaring: "Thank God for the Peruvian market!"
In the Garth Marenghi's Darkplace show within the show, Learner plays Thornton Reed, a camp hospital administrator who bears a trademark shotgun and cigar and answers to hospital boss "Won Ton." He is known in this respect for his brilliant but sometimes pathetic attempts at comedy, one of them being "If Won Ton hears about this, my arse is grass, and he's got a lawnmower!" (from Darkplace episode 4). This was not Learner and Marenghi's first major creative collaboration. Learner directed the seventies film adaptation of Marenghi's novel Bitch Killer, and also appears as Reed in Marenghi's 2006 movie, War of the Wasps. Clips of both projects were shown on Learner's chat show.

Apart from publishing Marenghi's books, appearing in Marenghi's TV shows and films and publishing various gentlemen's titles, Learner also has many other side projects, including the running of the Formula Five motor racing team "The Dean Team", with whom Steve Pising won four world titles. After leaving The Dean Team, Pising suffered a major crash in his first race with his new team, a crash which may or may not have been caused by Learner. After several years, Pising worked with Learner again on a new TV show, "The Learner", where they held auditions for a new job at Pising Parts, now owned by Learner. Dean has also released his own autobiography, "I Have A Dean", which has now been reduced to the special low price of £90.

Ayoade plays Learner as a very sleazy and underhand person. He is seemingly without emotion or ability to empathize with other people, perhaps a reason for his poor acting skills. For example, in the Darkplace special features, when asked what happened to "Ahmed", the original financial backer of Darkplace, Learner says: "Ahmed very sadly died. He was shot dead in his flat." and looks very conspicuously away from the camera. In another interview he also says that when Marenghi joined another Manager in the '80s, the manager very quickly died, and Garth returned to Learner. It is also implied he knows something about the disappearance of Darkplace co-star Madeleine Wool who played Liz Asher. He also makes reference to an incident in which he punches one of the child actors in the head. Although Dean seems to be genuinely friendly with Garth and, to a lesser extent, character actor Todd Rivers (played by Matt Berry), his relationship with other clients, colleagues and business associates of his (such as Steve Pising and folk singer Merriman Weir) are shown in Man to Man as being somewhat colder and more manipulative, culminating in the final episode of the series in which Dean and his cadre are shown as being primarily responsible for the woes of widely hated actor Randolph Caer.

Sexuality
Despite Learner's camp dress sense, he denies being homosexual. He has also been involved in pornography, including Channel Ladykiss.

External links
Official site

Learner, Dean
Fictional actors
Fictional magazine editors
Fictional Black British people
Garth Marenghi's Darkplace
British male characters in television